Statistics of Japanese Regional Leagues for the 1975 season.

Champions list

League standings

Kanto

Hokushinetsu

Tokai

Kansai

Chūgoku

Kyushu

1975
Jap
Jap
3